Bridge City Pizza is a pizzeria and sandwich restaurant in Portland, Oregon's Woodstock neighborhood, in the United States.

Description 
Bridge City Pizza is a restaurant serving Chicago-style pizza and sandwiches in southeast Portland's Woodstock neighborhood. The delivery-focused business has a small storefront and counter with six stools available for on-site dining, as of 2016. Behind the counter are painting depicting Al Capone and The Blues Brothers.

Alison Hallett of the Portland Mercury has described the pizza as "tavern-style" (thin crust, cut into squares). Pizzas range from 10 to 18 inches in diameter. Red sauce and toppings (including giardiniera) are made on site. The Willie the Wimp and His Cadillac Hawaiian has pineapple, the Chicago Fire has bacon, jalapeño and pork sausage, and the Big Hurt has ham, pepperoni, peppers, and portobello mushrooms. Bridge City has a gluten-free pizza. Sandwiches include Italian beef with au jus, meatball marinara, and the Froman (sausage). Sides include garlic breadsticks named after Elwood Blues, mozzarella sticks, fried mashed potato balls named after Coach K.

History 

Bridge City Pizza is operated by "thickly, hilariously accented" former Chicago residents. For Pizza Week in 2016, the restaurant served a pizza called The Antonio Abate. Named after the "patron saint of pizza makers" and cut into triangles, the pizza had barbecue chicken, bacon, Alabama white sauce, and sweet pickled vegetables.

Reception 
In 2014, Samantha Bakall of The Oregonian said Bridge City "happens to make the best Italian beef sandwich in the city, and it's not even close". Similarly, Willamette Week said the restaurant "makes what might be the best Italian Beef in town right now". Thrillist's Andy Kryza said Bridge City had Portland's best Chicago-style pizza in 2015. In 2016, Bakall recommend the Italian beef and said Bridge City "is worth a visit for any Chicago-Portland transplants homesick for Italian beef sandwiches and square-cut 'za". She also included the sandwich in her 2017 list of southeast Portland's 39 best "cheap eats".

In 2016, the Portland Mercury Alison Hallett called The Antonio Abate "hearty, filling, and deeply satisfying introduction to a pizza style that's hard to come by in Portland". Matthew Singer of Willamette Week called the sandwiches "gloriously gloppy monstrosities that bleed juice straight through the wrapping", and recommend the Italian beef. In late 2021, Eater Portland invited writers to share headline predictions for 2022. One of Bill Oakley's headlines read, "Portland Food Press Finally Notices Bridge City Pizza Which Has Been Making Absolutely Terrific Tavern-Style Pizza for Years But Getting Zero Attention". The website's Nathan Williams recommended Bridge City in an overview of eateries in the Woodstock neighborhood.

See also 

 Pizza in Portland, Oregon

References

External links 

 
 Bridge City Pizza at Zomato

Pizzerias in Portland, Oregon
Sandwich restaurants
Woodstock, Portland, Oregon